Glyphodes bicolor is a species of moth of the family Crambidae described by William John Swainson in 1821. It is widely distributed in the Old World tropics, including South Africa, China, Thailand, India, New Guinea and Australia (the Northern Territory and Queensland).

The wingspan is about 20 mm. Adults are dark brown with some translucent white patches on each wing. The larvae feed on Alstonia scholaris.

References

Moths described in 1821
Glyphodes